Weidman is an unincorporated community in Isabella County, Michigan, United States. It is a census-designated place (CDP) for statistical purposes, but has no independent municipal authority. The population of the CDP was 959 at the 2010 census, up from 879 at the 2000 census.

Geography
The built-up center of town is in the southern part of the CDP, on the south side of Lake of the Hills on the Coldwater River. The Coldwater is a south-flowing tributary of the Chippewa River and thus part of the Saginaw River drainage basin.

The community is situated on the boundary between Nottawa Township on the east and Sherman Township on the west. The area of the CDP within Sherman Township is somewhat larger than that within Nottawa Township. The Nottawa Township section, in addition, lies on part of the Isabella Indian Reservation. While the CDP has boundaries defined by the U.S. Census Bureau, there are no precise boundaries for the corresponding community. The postal delivery area for the Weidman ZIP code, 48893, is much larger than the CDP, including large portions of both Sherman and Nottawa townships as well as portions of Coldwater and Gilmore townships on the north and Broomfield and Deerfield townships on the south, as well as the village of Lake Isabella and the western half of the community of Beal City.

The area of the CDP, as defined in the 2010 census, includes all of the area of Section 1 in the northeast corner of Sherman Township, the portion of section 2 lying east of Walker Creek and Lake Windoga, all of section 12, except for a small portion west of Walker Creek, the portion of section 11 lying east of Walker Creek and a strip along the south of section 11 lying west of the Lake of the Hills. It includes the portion of section 14 lying north of Airline Road and the portion of section 13 lying north of Airline Road and east of Coldwater Road. In Nottawa Township, the CDP includes all of section 18, section 17 west of North La Pearl Road, and section 7 west of Johnson Road.

Demographics

As of the census of 2000, there were 879 people, 344 households, and 258 families residing in the CDP. The racial makeup of the CDP was 94.88% White, 0.34% Black or African American, 3.53% Native American, 0.23% Asian, 0.23% from other races, and 0.80% from two or more races. Hispanic or Latino of any race were 1.02% of the population.

There were 344 households, out of which 34.0% had children under the age of 18 living with them, 60.8% were married couples living together, 9.3% had a female householder with no husband present, and 25.0% were non-families. 20.3% of all households were made up of individuals, and 8.7% had someone living alone who was 65 years of age or older.  The average household size was 2.55 and the average family size was 2.92.

In the CDP, the population was spread out, with 26.2% under the age of 18, 7.3% from 18 to 24, 28.8% from 25 to 44, 23.3% from 45 to 64, and 14.4% who were 65 years of age or older.  The median age was 38 years. For every 100 females, there were 96.2 males.  For every 100 females age 18 and over, there were 96.7 males.

The median income for a household in the CDP was $36,042, and the median income for a family was $37,857. Males had a median income of $35,469 versus $19,732 for females. The per capita income for the CDP was $15,968.  About 8.9% of families and 9.9% of the population were below the poverty line, including 9.7% of those under age 18 and 10.2% of those age 65 or over.

Notable business
The Incredible Dr. Pol is a Nat Geo Wild reality show that follows veterinarian Jan Pol, his family and employees, centered around his veterinarian office in Weidman.

References

Unincorporated communities in Isabella County, Michigan
Census-designated places in Michigan
Unincorporated communities in Michigan
Census-designated places in Isabella County, Michigan